Nakera Simms is a Bahamian model. In 2001, she was named Miss Bahamas Universe. She represented the Bahamas in the Miss Universe 2001 and was named Miss Congeniality.  She attended Bethune-Cookman University.

References

Bahamian models
Miss Universe 2001 contestants
Year of birth missing (living people)
Living people